The 1985 Hong Kong Legislative Council election was an indirect election for members of the Legislative Council of Hong Kong (LegCo) held on 26 September 1985. It was the first ever election of the Legislative Council in Hong Kong which marked the beginning of the Hong Kong representative democracy.

After the Sino-British Joint Declaration, the Hong Kong government decided to start the process of democratisation in Hong Kong based on the consultative document Green Paper: the Further Development of Representative Government in Hong Kong published on 18 July 1984. There were 12 members elected by the Electoral Colleges and 12 by the functional constituencies, four official members and the rest of the seats were appointed by the Governor.

Composition

Electoral colleges
12 unofficial members were elected by the electoral college comprised all members of the District Boards, the Urban Council and the new Regional Council. In order to achieve a more balanced and adequate representation the District Boards would be grouped into ten geographical constituencies each representing approximately 500,000 people. The remaining two seats would be provided by the two special constituencies formed respectively by members of the Urban Council and the Regional Council. The interests of the Heung Yee Kuk would be represented through the Regional Council. The 12 constituencies formed from the electoral college were:
 East Island: Eastern District and Wan Chai District
 West Island: Central & Western District and Southern District
 Kwun Tong: Kwun Tong District
 Wong Tai Sin: Wong Tai Sin District
 Kowloon City: Kowloon City District
 Sham Shui Po: Sham Shui Po District
 South Kowloon: Mong Kok District and Yau Ma Tei District
 East New Territories: North District, Tai Po District and Shatin District
 West New Territories: Yuen Long District and Tuen Mun District
 South New Territories: Tsuen Wan District (including Tsing Yi), Islands District and Sai Kung District
 Urban Council
 Regional Council

Functional constituencies
Nine functional constituencies returned 12 unofficial members to the Legislative Council. The commercial, industrial, and labour constituencies would each return two unofficial members to the Legislative Council. The remaining six constituencies would each return one unofficial member. The nine functional constituencies and their representative organizations were:
 Commercial (2 seats):
 First Commercial: Hong Kong General Chamber of Commerce 
 Second Commercial: Chinese General Chamber of Commerce
 Industrial (2 seats): 
 First Industrial: Federation of Hong Kong Industries
 Second Industrial: Chinese Manufacturers' Association of Hong Kong 
 Financial: Hong Kong Association of Banks
 Labour (2 seats): all registered employee trade unions 
 Social Services: Hong Kong Council of Social Service 
 Medical: Hong Kong Medical Association
 Teaching 
 Legal 
 Engineering, Architectural, Surveying and Planning

Results

Electoral College Constituencies

Functional Constituencies

See also
 Democratic development in Hong Kong
 History of Hong Kong

References

Hong Kong
1985 in Hong Kong
Legislative
1985 elections in British Overseas Territories
September 1985 events in Asia